Behdaq (also Romanized as Behdāq; also known as Nūr Alahī, Nūrallāhī, and Nūr Ilāhi) is a village in Honam Rural District, in the Central District of Selseleh County, Lorestan Province, Iran. At the 2006 census, its population was 211, in 42 families.

References 

Towns and villages in Selseleh County